Medardo González Trejo (Born in San Miguel, on April 16, 1952) is a Salvadoran politician. Since 2004 he is the Secretary General of the Farabundo Martí National Liberation Front (FMLN). He currently serves as a deputy in Legislative Assembly of El Salvador.

Biography 
In 1972, he joined the People (FPL), one of the five armed organizations in 1980 formed the FMLN Farabundo Marti Liberation Forces. He adopted the pseudonym of Commander Milton Méndez. During the Salvadoran Civil War, he was a member of the Political Commission of the FPL, and commanded guerrilla units in the departments of San Vicente and Cabañas.

After the signing of the Peace Accords in 1992, the FMLN, was transformed into a political party. From 1993 to 2004, González was a member of the National Council of the FMLN.

In 2000, he was elected to the Legislative Assembly for a period of three years.

In November 2004 he was a candidate to general coordinator in the internal elections of the FMLN, with the backing of the historical leader Schafik Hándal, being elected with 62% of the votes, thus defeating the candidate Óscar Ortiz, identified with the reformist sectors match.

References

1952 births
Living people
Farabundo Martí National Liberation Front politicians
People from San Miguel, El Salvador
Members of the Legislative Assembly of El Salvador